More Colours! or better known as More Colours!: The Million Colour Revolution Revisited Twice is a double album by The Pinker Tones, released in 2007. It consists mostly of remixes from The Million Colour Revolution. In the second disc contains 3 bonus tracks which is from the first album, The BCN Connection.

Track listing

Disc 1
"Señoras y Señores" - Remix by Professor Manso
"Welcome to TMCR" - Remix by Alex Acosta (Mojo Project)
"Karma Hunters" - Remix by Mexican Institute of Sound
"Beyond Nostalgia" - Remix by Kassin (The+2's)
"L'Heros" - Remix by Torpedo Boyz
"Sonido Total (DJ Niño's Million Guitar Remix) " - Remix by TPT & DJ Niño
"Piccolissima Descarga" - Remix by El Miku
"In Pea We Nuts" - Cover by TPT
"Pink Freud" - Remix by Dyko
"Many Years Ago" - Remix by DJ Niño
"Love Tape vs Medium Waves" - Mash-up by TPT
"Mojo Moog" - Remix by The Submarines
"Pinkerland Becaina" - Remix by Gigi el Amoroso
"Gone, Go On" - Remix by Pecker
"Maybe Next Saturday" - Cover by Juzz
"TMCR Grand Finale" - Cover by EllzaPoppinzz
Bonus tracks
"Love Tape" - Live acoustic cover @ KCRW by TPT
"TMCR Grand Finale" - Remix by Galáctico
"Sonido Total" - Remix by Capri

Disc 2
"Señoras y Señores" · Remix by Mister Furia
"Welcome to TMCR" · Remix by Alex Acosta (Mojo Project)
"Karma Hunters" · Remix by DJ Niño
"Beyond Nostalgia" · Remix by Daniel Melero
"L'Heros" · Remix by Danbeat
"Sonido Total" · Remix by Concorde Music Club
"Piccolissima Descarga" · Acapella cover by TPT
"In Pea We Nuts" · Remix by Panóptica (Nortec Collective)
"Pink Freud" · Remix by Moreno Veloso, A. Kassim, Domenico L.
"Many Years Ago" · Remix by Professor Manso
"Love Tape" · Remix by Jeff Automatic
"Mojo Moog" · Remix by Styrofoam
"Pinkerland Becaina vs Welcome to TMCR" · Mash-up remix by TPT
"Gone, Go On" · Remix by Z Bosio (Soda Estéreo) & And Body (Simon)
"Maybe Next Saturday" · Remix by PJ Rose
"TMCR Grand Finale" · Remix by Kinky
Bonus tracks
"Viva la Juventud" · Remix by TPT
"One of Them (Readymade Jazz Exercise)" · Remix by Konishi Yasuharu
"Mais Pourquois? (BCN Mix)" · (Remix by Ursula 1000)

The Pinker Tones albums
2007 remix albums